Bernadette Swinnerton is a former English racing cyclist. She came second in the 1969 Road World Championship road race in Czechoslovakia, 1m 10s behind Audrey McElmury.

Cycling
In addition to the silver medal at the 1969 UCI Road World Championships she won four British National Track Championships in the sprint event. She was also National grass track champion in 1968, 1970, 1971.

Family
Bernardette Swinnerton was born in Fenton, Stoke-on-Trent during 1951, the eldest of seven children. The Swinnerton family were a cycling family, Swinnerton Cycles was founded in 1915, in Victoria Road, Fenton, Stoke-on-Trent. Roy Swinnerton (1925-2013 and a national grass champion in 1956) and his wife Doris (née Salt) took over the shop in 1956 and set up a cycling club called Stoke ACCS during 1970.

Bernadette's brother Paul was a two times British track champion, her sister Catherine was a two times British road race champion, Margaret, Mark and Bernard were all British internationals and Frances also competed for the club.

Career
Bernardette Swinnerton retired after 40 years of teaching, spending the last 17 years of her career as a headteacher in Blythe Bridge, Stoke-on-Trent.  She has 3 children and 4 grandchildren.

Palmarès 

1969
2nd Road race, UCI Road World Championships

References

External links 

1951 births
Living people
English female cyclists
People from Cheadle, Staffordshire
Sportspeople from Staffordshire